Tungesvik is a surname. Notable people with the surname include:

Hans Olav Tungesvik (1936–2017), Norwegian physician and politician
Steinulf Tungesvik (born 1965), Norwegian jurist and politician

Norwegian-language surnames